R-4 regional road is a Montenegrin roadway.

It serves as extension to R-3 regional road and a connection between Pljevlja and Priboj, Serbia.

History

In January 2016, the Ministry of Transport and Maritime Affairs published bylaw on categorisation of state roads. With new categorisation, new R-4 regional road on this route was established from previous municipal road.

Major intersections

References

R-4